Pedro García (born 1932) is a Peruvian boxer. He competed in the men's featherweight event at the 1948 Summer Olympics.

References

1932 births
Living people
Peruvian male boxers
Olympic boxers of Peru
Boxers at the 1948 Summer Olympics
Place of birth missing (living people)
Featherweight boxers